The 2016 Herald Sun Tour was a road cycling stage race that took place in Victoria, Australia, between 3 and 7 February 2016. The race was rated as a 2.1 event as part of the 2016 UCI Oceania Tour.

The race included five stages: the first was a prologue individual time trial; the remaining four stages were road stages, including a summit finish at Arthurs Seat on the final day.

The champion of the 2015 Herald Sun Tour, Cameron Meyer, did not take part, as his new team  was not invited to the race.

Will Clarke won the prologue for the second consecutive year and was the first rider to lead the race. He lost the lead on the second stage, when the  riders Chris Froome and Peter Kennaugh broke away to cross the line 17 seconds ahead of the field; Kennaugh won the stage and took the lead. The following two stages ended in sprints (won by 's Caleb Ewan and 's John Murphy respectively), during which Kennaugh increased his lead. On the final stage, Froome attacked on the penultimate ascent of Arthurs Seat, then attacked again on the final climb to win the stage and take the overall victory. Kennaugh was second, 29 seconds behind, with Damien Howson third, more than a minute behind Froome. Froome also won the mountains classification and Team Sky won the team classification. Chris Hamilton (Australia) was the best young rider, with Benjamin Hill taking the sprints classification.

Teams 

Sixteen teams were invited to take part in the race. These included three UCI WorldTeams, five UCI Professional Continental teams, seven UCI Continental teams and a national team.

Stages

Prologue 

3 February 2015 – Melbourne,

Stage 1 

4 February 2015 – Healesville–Healesville,

Stage 2 

5 February – Yarra Glen–Moe,

Stage 3 

6 February – Traralgon–Inverloch,

Stage 4 

7 February – Arthurs Seat–Arthurs Seat,

Classification leadership table

References

External links 

 

2016
Herald Sun Tour
Herald Sun Tour
February 2016 sports events in Australia